is a Japanese actor and singer. He was born on July 14, 1952, in Ashibetsu, Hokkaidō, Japan.

Biography
Mizutani was raised from the age of eight in Tokyo, Japan. He started acting at the age of twelve, when a neighbor introduced him to a children's acting school in the area. When he discovered that going to an acting school wasn't the same as meeting the people he admired on TV, he wanted to quit, but by that time he had been selected to play a small role in a 'Vampire', a television movie being filmed by Fuji Television. This role launched his reluctant career, and though he purposely took a number of years off work to try studying, his failing to get into university urged him to continue in the acting business.

It was after the age of 20 when his career as an actor finally took off. His first major drama was in 1974, called Kizu Darake no Tenshi (Battered Angel).

At the moment Mizutani stars in a regular TV Asahi detective drama called Aibō with actors Yasufumi Terawaki (2000-2008, 2022-), Mitsuhiro Oikawa (2009-2012), Hiroki Narimiya (2012-2015) and Takashi Sorimachi (2015-2022).

Music
In addition to acting, his agency, "TRI-SUM", also encouraged him to put out music albums starting from 1977, all of which sold very well. His last album was released in 2009 (Time Traveler).

Mizutani is currently under the avex IO label of the Avex Group.

Filmography

Film
The Youth Killer (1976) – Jun Saiki
Taiyō o Nusunda Otoko (1979) – A police officer 
Kofuku (1981) – Murakami
A Boy Called H (2013) – Morio
Aibou: The Movie III (2014) – Ukyō Sugishita
Chateau de la Reine (2015) – Ukyō Kitashirakawa
Tap The Last Show (2017) – Watari (also director)
Leaving the Scene (2019) – Mitsuo Tokiyama (also director and writer)
Sun and Bolero (2022) – Ken Tōdō (also director and writer)

Television
Taiyō ni Hoero! (1972–74) – Mamoru (ep. 1), Jirō (ep. 30), Kyōichi (ep. 54) and Saburō (ep. 109)
The Water Margin (1973),
Shinsho Taikōki (1973), Akechi Hidemitsu
Kizudarake no Tenshi (1974–1975) – Akira Inui
Akai Gekiryū (1977) – Toshio Tashiro
Otokotachi no Tabiji (1976-1982) - Yōhei Sugimoto (by ep. 1, 4th season)
Netchu Jidai (1978–81) – Kōdai Kitano
Tantei Monogatari (1979) – Ichirō Tamura (ep. 5)
Kyotaro Nishimura Suspense -Susumu Samonji (1999–2013)
AIBOU: Tokyo Detective Duo (2000–) – Ukyō Sugishita
Izakaya Moheji (2011–) – Heiji Yonemoto

Anime
Doraemon (2018) – Ukyō Sugishita

Personal relationships
Mizutani was once married to an American actress by the name of Miki MacKenzie in 1982. They divorced in 1986. He is now married to ex-pop idol Ran Ito from the 1970s singing group Candies. He has one daughter.

References

External links
 Yutaka Mizutani on Avex Group
 

Japanese male actors
Actors from Hokkaido
Living people
1952 births
Japanese male singers
Avex Group artists
Musicians from Hokkaido